Kushk-e Sofla (also Romanized as Kūshk-e Soflá and Kooshk Soflá; also known as Gūshk-e Pā’īn, Gūshk-e Soflá, Gushk Pāīn, and Kūshk-e Pā’īn) is a village in Dashtab Rural District, in the Central District of Baft County, Kerman Province, Iran. At the 2006 census, its population was 112, in 25 families.

References 

Populated places in Baft County